Mount Pleasant henge is a Neolithic henge enclosure in the English county of Dorset. It lies southeast of Dorchester in the civil parish of West Stafford. It still partially survives as an earthwork.

Description 
Like other 'superhenge' sites such as Durrington Walls much of the earthworks have been ploughed or weathered away and it was not rediscovered until Stuart Piggott visited the area in 1936. On finding the site they diagnosed it as a henge as its bank was outside its ditch and a later Bronze Age barrow (known as Conquer Barrow) had been placed on top of the bank. The enclosure is egg-shaped, measuring  along its long axis and dates to 2878–2470 cal BC.

A geophysical survey in 1969 identified entrances to the henge enclosure and a smaller inner henge enclosure at the south western end of  diameter. Excavation in the 1960s revealed little material in the henge ditch though some fragments of grooved ware and children's skeletons were found. The inner enclosure however contained large numbers of postholes. The holes were arranged in five concentric rings with a cross-shaped layout of aisles leading into the centre. Within the aisles were further holes interpreted as being for stones. This inner feature was similar to timber circle features at The Sanctuary and Woodhenge.

Consisting of large oak timbers placed at  intervals it would have served as a huge barrier to the middle of the site. Evidence that the timber posts that had stood in the trench were burnt was also seen. Two entrances were found in the palisade, each only . The timber enclosure was built around 500 years after the outer henge enclosure and caused the builders to remodel the enclosure earthworks.

The henge enclosure is the type site for the Mount Pleasant Period of the later Neolithic.

A study of the 'mega henge' has concluded that its construction was under way in around 2,500 BC, and it was built in between 35 and 125 years, not over centuries as had previously been thought.

References

External links
The Megalithic Portal:  Mount Pleasant - Henge in England in Dorset

Buildings and structures in Dorset
History of Dorchester, Dorset
Stone Age sites in England
Archaeological sites in Dorset
Archaeological type sites
Henges